Nádia Lippi (born 12 March 1956, in São Paulo) is a Brazilian actress. She has appeared in the soap operas  "Um Dia, O Amor", "Pai Herói" and "Brilhante".

She played Lady Jane Grey in a 1972 Brazilian TV adaptation of The Prince and the Pauper.

References

External links 

Brazilian actresses
Living people
1956 births